Osborn Maitland Miller (1897–1979) was a Scottish-American cartographer, surveyor and aerial photographer. A member of several expeditions himself, he also acted as adviser to other explorers. He developed several map projections, including the Bipolar Oblique Conic Conformal, the Miller Oblated Stereographic, and most notably the Miller Cylindrical in 1942.

The Maitland Glacier in Antarctica was named after Miller in 1952. He was awarded the Charles P. Daly Medal in 1962.

Miller was born in Perth in 1897, and educated at Glenalmond College and the Royal Military Academy, Woolwich, after which he served as a regular officer in the Royal Field Artillery in the First World War, being awarded the Military Cross in 1917.

Miller worked for the American Geographical Society from 1922 until 1968, and the Osborn Maitland Miller Cartographic Medal for "outstanding contributions in the field of cartography or geodesy" was established in his honour.

References

1897 births
1979 deaths
American cartographers
People from Perth, Scotland
Scottish cartographers
People educated at Glenalmond College
Royal Field Artillery officers
Recipients of the Military Cross
British Army personnel of World War I
Scottish inventors
British emigrants to the United States
20th-century cartographers
20th-century Scottish people
Aerial photographers
Scottish photographers
20th-century American photographers
Scottish explorers
American explorers
20th-century American people
Graduates of the Royal Military Academy, Woolwich
American Geographical Society
20th-century American inventors